The Roman Catholic Diocese of Ngaoundéré is a diocese located in the city of Ngaoundéré in the Ecclesiastical province of Garoua in Cameroon.

History
 November 19, 1982: Established as Diocese of Ngaoundéré from the Metropolitan Archdiocese of Garoua

Leadership
 Bishops of Ngaoundéré (Roman rite), in reverse chronological order
 Bishop Emmanuel Abbo (March 15, 2016 – Present)
 Bishop Joseph Djida, O.M.I. (October 23, 2000 - January 6, 2015)
 Bishop Jean-Marie-Joseph-Augustin Pasquier, O.M.I. (November 19, 1982 – October 23, 2000)

See also
Roman Catholicism in Cameroon

References

External links
 GCatholic.org

Ngaoundere
Ngaoundere
Ngaoundere
1982 establishments in Cameroon
Roman Catholic Ecclesiastical Province of Garoua